Kieran Kelly (25 June 1978 – 12 August 2003) was an Irish jump jockey who died as a result of a racing accident.

Kelly was born in County Kildare and achieved his first Cheltenham Festival success in March 2003 on Hardy Eustace in the Royal & SunAlliance Novices' Hurdle.

He was critically injured in a fall in on 8 August 2003 at Kilbeggan racecourse and remained on life support in Beaumont Hospital in north Dublin. He died four days later at the age of 25.

References

1978 births
2003 deaths
Irish jockeys
Jockeys who died while racing
Sportspeople from County Kildare
Sport deaths in the Republic of Ireland